The following is a list of stories written by Stuart McLean featuring his popular fictional characters "Dave and Morley" from the radio program The Vinyl Cafe. First read on air in 1994, many of the stories were eventually compiled in book form, followed by audio recording compilations from the program.

Note that this list features only the stories that have been published in book form and on audio. Numerous other stories have been written and read out loud on the radio show, but are not currently listed. Several stories also have titles in the book different from those on the audio versions.

The first collection of stories in book form, Stories from the Vinyl Cafe, contains several stories that did not feature Dave and Morley or any other characters acquainted with them. Subsequent collections of stories featured Dave and Morley-related content exclusively.

Characters
The major characters in the stories are Dave, Morley, their family and assorted friends and neighbours. The family's last name is never mentioned, although in one story Dave's mother's name is given as Margaret McNeil.

Dave, Morley, and Family
 Dave is in his late forties to early fifties. He runs an independent record store, called "The Vinyl Cafe", whose slogan is "We may not be big, but we're small". Dave represents an alternative view on life that is not based on financial success and status but on human relationships and music. He grew up in Big Narrows, on Cape Breton Island, where his mother Margaret still resides. Dave is frequently neurotic and prone to small accidents and mishaps that he usually inadvertently escalates into major ones and he is somewhat of a hypochondriac. He is painfully awkward and a terrible liar. These attributes motivate many of the stories, which range from an incident with the Christmas turkey, to accidentally destroying Mary Turlington's treasured candles, to filling the elementary school playground with frogs. It is his wife, Morley, who often has to resolve the mess Dave creates.
 Dave enjoys a good prank and has a tradition of pulling outrageous jokes on his friend, Kenny Wong (owner of "Wong's Scottish Meat Pies"), every April Fools' Day. Dave worked as a tour manager "for some of the best indie acts; certainly for some of the weirdest" before he met Morley. His enjoyment of pranks is seen in his younger days as a tour manager, as well. Dave's last name has never been revealed; although in "School Days", his mother's last name is McNeal, it's unclear whether she uses her married name or reverted to her maiden name after Dave's father died.
 Morley was a stay-at-home mom, until she re-entered the workforce. She is currently employed at a local theatre. She loves to figure-skate. She and Dave first met at an ice-rink in Providence, Rhode Island, when they were in their twenties. She is often more level-headed and practical than Dave and frequently long-suffering when it comes to his adventures. Morley works hard at running the family and, more often than not, Dave is more like a third child to her. Dave will then go to great lengths to prove his love again. Morley was named for McLean's personal friend David Morley; the story "Skunks", the first to introduce Morley, was inspired by a real incident that had happened to David Morley's family. 
 Stephanie is a jaded and skeptical Toronto teenager who often fights with her brother Sam. In the first stories, she was fourteen or fifteen years old. She was frequently rebellious and sullen which led to many disagreements with her parents and Sam. In more recent stories, she attends university in another city and dates a young man named Tommy Nowlan. Since then, some episodes feature coming of age stories. She spent one summer planting trees north of Thunder Bay. Soon after her job ended, Stephanie visited her aged 'Aunt Dorothy' in England. She assumed that she would dislike the trip but discovered an interest in history and the past while on her trip.
 Sam is about seven or eight years younger than Stephanie. In many stories, he was referred to as seven; although his age has recently made a jump to age eleven. Only a few stories have Sam placed at any age between seven and eleven. Despite his ineptitude at sports, he plays goalie on his hockey team and plays on the girls field hockey team, which was the subject of one story. He likes to knit and help his neighbours, Eugene and Maria. Sam is frequently portrayed as sensitive, slightly goofy and often naive. Several of his friends have been minor characters in several stories.  This includes a skateboarding girl whom he met on a school trip to Quebec City, when he missed the bus to an IMAX theatre;  although they spoke different languages and he never got her contact information or even her name, it proved an exhilaratingly romantic experience for the boy. According to Stuart McLean's friends and colleagues, Sam is the character who most resembles McLean himself.
 Arthur is the family dog. He likes soft ice-cream and considers himself dominant to Dave (much to Dave's surprise) and steals socks and potatoes. He was once a sheep in a Christmas pageant. Arthur is considered a full family member. In a story at the end of the Revenge of the Vinyl Cafe collection (2015), Arthur dies of old age and is mourned by the family. After the story of his death was originally broadcast on the radio show, McLean named his "Arthur Awards", an annual episode in which he would present awards to people whose acts of kindness and generosity were nominated by listeners, after the dog.
 Galway is the mysterious family cat, who came from Dave's sister Annie, and is named for American poet Galway Kinnell. Galway was intentionally brought on one family vacation and accidentally came on another, by stowing away in the trunk. The vacation was ruined partially due to her. She was briefly toilet-trained (until she almost flushed herself down the toilet) but still enjoys flushing the toilet when the bathroom door is left open.
Margaret is Dave's mother. She still lives in Dave's childhood home in Big Narrows. Before retirement, Margaret taught elementary school in Big Narrows and was known for her ability to burp the alphabet. After the death of her husband and Dave's father, Charlie, she was a widow for many years. She recently remarried a local volunteer firefighter named Smith Gardener. 
Charlie is Dave's father. He died before the stories began and in the story Fish Head, Dave mentions that Charlie died just before Sam was born. Charlie was musically talented and introduced both his children to music. He would wake them up singing each morning and would often have local musicians over to the house for an informal jam session.  
Annie is Dave's younger sister. The age gap is never clear but seems to be about three years. Annie is a concert violinist and has a daughter, Margot. When she is on tour one summer, she asks Dave and Morley to care for Margot, who is ten years old at the time. Galway was given to Dave and Morley by Annie as she could not keep a cat while touring. 
Helen is Morley's mother. In the initial stories, Helen (sometimes called Nancy) is still married to Morley's father. However, in the later stories, it is mentioned that Morley's father has died. Helen briefly lives with the family when Morley is concerned about her ability to live alone. The arrangement ends after only a few months when Helen moves into a retirement community.
Aunt Dorothy is a cousin of Margaret. She lives in London, England, and has never married or had children. She is known for her brusqueness and impulsiveness about travel, having invited herself to go camping with Dave and his family, and having sent Stephanie, unannounced, a prepaid air ticket to London so she could visit.

Other recurring characters
 Jim Scoffield is Dave's closest friend and neighbour, although he has a tendency to be present at Dave's most awkward moments, such as Dave's infamous incident with the Christmas turkey. Jim is originally from the Annapolis Valley, Nova Scotia. He is described as a "confirmed bachelor" and owns a cat named Molly. He briefly dated one of Dave's cousins and a romantic relationship with his friend and cat sitter has been hinted at.  
 Bert and Mary Turlington live next door to Dave and Morley. They have three children, Adam, who is younger than Stephanie, and twins Chris and Christina, who are older than Sam. Bert is a talkative criminal lawyer, while Mary is a chartered accountant and Dave's neighbourhood nemesis. Her meticulous perfectionism and fixed ideas of an ordered life make her Dave's opposite; her plans and projects are frequently upended by Dave's propensity for causing chaos. Mary resents that Dave loves his job, considering his happy-go-lucky lifestyle sanctimonious and phony, while Dave thinks that Mary is stiff and intimidating.'They have a teacup Pomeranian dog named Tissue. 
 Ted and Polly Anderson are an elegant upper-class couple who throw an annual Christmas house-party. Polly is the neighbourhood's "Martha Stewart" figure and "perfect home-maker". Morley often feels inadequate around Polly. Ted is an avid cyclist.
 Carl and Gerta Lowbeer are neighbours of Morley and Dave. They are somewhat older, Carl having recently retired from his job as an engineer. He keenly missed the company fishing trip and has since started to attend the fishing tourney with Dave and other neighbours as part of his team. Since retirement, Carl has begun to take philosophy courses. Carl once asked Dave to "babysit" his sourdough bread starter, while he and Gerta were on holiday. Gerta has been revealed to be a keen birdwatcher and is a close friend of Morley. 
 Morty and Irene Zuckerman live on Brock Avenue, a five-minute walk away. Not particularly close friends, Morty's surprise invitation to dinner one night is the subject of the story "Late Date".
Emir and Rashida Chudary are new residents in Dave and Morley's neighbourhood. Emir considers Dave to be an imbecile & their families do not socialize much. However, Emirs' attitude softens after Rashida recruits Dave to help their young daughter Fatima overcome her nightmares, a problem Dave's daughter Stephanie also suffered from at a young age. Their lack of understanding of Canadian gift giving expectations at Christmas sparks a mass gift exchange in the neighbourhood on one occasion. Sam and his friend Murphy occasionally babysit Fatima one summer, which prompts the creation of the infamous water slide.  
 Eugene and Maria Conte are an elderly couple who live next-door. Eugene loves to garden. His famous fig tree is the focus of a story. Maria loves to dote on the children. They have a son, Anthony Thomas, who lives in London. They have always called Anthony Thomas "Tony" but he has been going by his middle name ever since moving to England. Eugene is originally from a village in Calabria called Rendi in Fiori. Sam and Eugene are friends, and Sam helps with the emails that Tony sends them. Eugene makes home-made wine, and has offered it to Sam on several occasions. He tends to smoke cigars. Dave is often concerned about their well being and their strange habit of only living in the basement of their house but realizes they will ask for help when they need it. Morely first meets Maria when brings over a basket of homegrown tomatoes after Stephanie is born. 
 Kenny Wong runs Wong's Scottish Meat Pies, a shop located near the Vinyl Cafe. It is largely referred to as a Chinese restaurant, but has once supplied meat pies and deep-fried Mars bars to Sam's birthday party. Kenny is from the town of Burnt Creek. While he was living there, he and his family were excluded by most of the town's citizens because they were the only Chinese family living there. Kenny is known for his austerity and his loyalty to his "regulars". He enjoys pranks just as much as Dave, who is frequently the victim in his jokes, and vice versa.
 Murphy Kruger is in Sam's class and his best friend. He and Sam cause some minor mischief in several stories and live in their own world. Murphy often motivates Sam to their adventures. Murphy is Jewish and has a Bar Mitzvah in one episode. 
 Peter Moore is another one of Sam's friends. On the grade 8 trip to Quebec City, Peter spent all of his money on plastic trolls.
 Emil is a homeless man who resides around the Vinyl Cafe and occasionally asks for money from various people around the neighbourhood. He has his own philosophy of life, and is a lovable misfit who for some time had his own library in a shopping cart and started gardening plants in public places. He once won ten thousand dollars in the lottery, which he quickly gave away to his regular donors.
Dorothy Capper is a friend of Dave's, who owns "Woodsworth's Books". Her store is located down the street from the Vinyl Cafe, and Dave frequently stops by just to hang out and ask for advice on some neurotic problem. There have been two stories focused on her in the series. The first one is about her problems with her dog, Stanley, and the second is about her growing disinterest in owning a book store. At the end of the story, her zest for selling books is renewed and she continues to run her store.
Marcus Portnoy is the bully at Sam's school.

Collections of Stories in Book Form

Stories from the Vinyl Cafe (1995)
The Pig
Tunnel of Love
Rock of Ages (not about Dave and Morley)
The Jock Strap
New York City (not about Dave and Morley)
Breakfast, Lunch, Dinner ("Late Date with the Zuckermans")
Stanley  (not about Dave and Morley, but about Dorothy Capper, an acquaintance)
Driving Lessons ("Driving")
Fresh, Never Frozen (not about Dave and Morley)
Skunks
Sports Injuries (not about Dave and Morley)
Shirts
The Secret of Life (not about Dave and Morley)
Dorothy
A Ton of Fun (not about Dave and Morley)
Be-Bop-A-Lula ("Blood Pressure Chair")
Polaroids (not about Dave and Morley)
Make Money! Get Prizes!
Remembrance Day (found only on 10-year anniversary edition of the book)

Home from the Vinyl Cafe (1998)
Dave Cooks the Turkey
Holland
Valentine's Day
Sourdough
Music Lessons
Burd ("The Bird")
Emil
The Birthday Party ("Credit Card Birthday")
Summer Camp
The Cottage
Road Trip ("Cat in the Car")
Labour Days
School Days
A Day Off ("Day Off")
On the Roof ("Dave on the Roof")
Polly Anderson's Christmas Party

Vinyl Cafe Unplugged (2000)
Arthur ("Arthur the Dog")
Galway ("Toilet Training the Cat")
The Fly
Christmas Presents
Harrison Ford's Toes
Dorothy ("Cousin Dorothy")
The Last Kind Word Blues
The Bare Truth
Susan is Serious
Odd Jobs
The Razor's Edge
Morley's Christmas Pageant ("Morley's Christmas Concert") 
Figs ("The Fig Tree")
Love Never Ends

Vinyl Cafe Diaries (2003)
Walking Man
Dave and the Duck ("Dave's Wedding Ring")
Tree of Heaven
Lazy Lips ("Dave Gives a Speech")
Labour Pains
Birthday Presents ("Morley's Birthday Bash")
Rashida, Amir and the Great Gift-Giving ("Christmas with Rasheeda and Ahmeer")
Book Club ("Morley's Book Club")
A Night to Remember ("Dave Goes Babysitting")
Dorm Days
Best Things
Christmas on the Road
Field Trip
No Tax on Truffles
Gifted
Planet Boy

Secrets from the Vinyl Cafe (2006)
Opera
Carl's Retirement
Tree Planting
Sam the Athlete
Rendi
Sam's Predictions
Kenny Wong's Practical Jokes
The Hairdresser
Dad is Dying
Teeth
Dave and the Dentist
The Laundry Chute ("Springhill")
The Phone Message
A Science Experiment
Christmas at the Turlingtons
The Family Business ("Sam Steals")

Extreme Vinyl Cafe (2009)
Sam Goes Green
The Birthday Cake
Spring in the Narrows
Wally
London
Dave's Funeral ("Dave Buys a Coffin")
Petit Lac Noir
Rat-a-tat-tat
A Trip to Quebec
Newsboy Dave
The Waterslide
Margaret Gets Married
The Cruise
The Lottery Ticket
Dave and the Roller Coaster

The Vinyl Cafe Notebooks (2010)
NOTES FROM HOME
Driving the 401
The Piano
My Palm Tree
Losing Paul
Watchfulness
My To Do List
Ants
Keepsakes
The Sentimentality of Suits
The Morning Paper
Radio
Peter Gzowski
The People You Love

CALENDAR NOTES
Signs of Spring
Maple Syrup Time
Early April 2009
Worms
Summer Jobs
September
A Letter to a Young Friend Heading Back to School
Autumn
Piano Tuners
Approaching Winter
Hibernation
Salt of the Earth
February
Snowman

NOTES FROM THE NEIGHBOURHOOD
Boy, Bike, Chair
Toronto
The Parking Spot
Garbage
Haircuts by Children
The World Cup
The Front Lawn
Kissing Contest
Small Decisions
Silence
George Learns to Swim
The Key
Safe Places
The Girl with the Globe

TASTING NOTES
New Year’s Eggs
The Tall Grass Prairie Bread Company
Apple Peeling
Watermelon
Ode to the Potato
The Bay Leaf
Cherry Season 2006
READER’S NOTES
Book Buying
The Thomas Fisher Rare Book Library
W.O. Mitchell
The Island of No Adults
Free Books
The Creation of Sam McGee
Quentin Reynolds
Leacock Country

NOTES FROM THE ROAD
The Way Which Is Not the Way
In Praise of Curling
Robert Stanfield's Grave
The Imperial Theatre, Saint John, New Brunswick
Biking Across Canada
Bridge Walking
Getting to Swift Current
Prairie Wind
Parliament Hill
Maynard Helmer
Motels
Meeting Famous People
Maxine Montgomery
Gander International Airport
My Favourite Photograph
Roger Woodward and Niagara Falls

NOTES TO SELF
My Hello Problem
Summer Jobs Redux
Rug versus Chair
Spelling
I Am Deeply Sorry
The Joy of Socks
On Beauty
The Wall Clock
Parking Lot Blues
The National Umbrella Collective
Bob Dylan’s Phone Number
The Girl in the Green Dress
The Desk Lamp

Revenge of the Vinyl Cafe (2012)
Hello, Monster
Annie's Turn
Macaulay's Mountain
Tour de Dave ("Dave and the Bike")
The House Next Door
Summer of Stars
Rhoda's Revenge
Fish Head
Rosemary Honey
The Haunted House of Cupcakes
Midnight in the Garden of Envy
The Black Beast of Margaree
Curse of the Crayfish
Whatever Happened to Johnny Flowers?
Attack of the Treadmill ("Dave's Shoelace")
Gabriel Dubois
Code Yellow
Le Morte d'Arthur

Vinyl Cafe Turns The Page (2016)
Sam's Underwear
Defibrillator
Danceland
Boy Wanted
Jim and Molly the Cat
Stephanie's Exam
Stamps
Foggy Bottom Bay
Murphy's Signature
Helen Moves In
Float Tank
Home Alone
In The Weeds
Prince Charles
Jim's Train Trip
Sam's First Kiss
Roadkill
Yoga Camp
Town Hall

Collections of Stories in Audio Form

At the Vinyl Cafe: The Christmas Concert (1997)
The 1996 Christmas special of the Vinyl Cafe was released on audio and features two stories:
Dave on the Roof ("On the Roof")
Dave Cooks the Turkey

Vinyl Cafe Stories (1998)
The Jock Strap (9:17)
Holland (18:49)
Driving Lessons (7:59)
School Days (17:14)
The Bird (17:47)
Cat in the Car (18:50)
Emil (14:33)
A Day Off (10:09)
Polly Anderson's Christmas Party (23:08)

The Vinyl Cafe On Tour (1999)
Late Date (13:26)
Morley's Christmas Concert (23:53)
School Lunch (16:00)
The Fly (19:04)
Harrison Ford's Toes (22:45)
Blood Pressure Chair (15:21)
Sam's Birthday (17:35)
Cousin Dorothy (16:32)

Vinyl Cafe Odd Jobs (2001)
Toilet Training the Cat (20:54)
Music Lessons (16:05)
Arthur the Dog (14:34)
Love Never Ends (22:30)
Odd Jobs (18:20)
The Fig Tree (17:36)
No Tax on Truffles (22:09)
The Bare Truth (16:24)

Vinyl Cafe Inc. Coast to Coast Story Service (2002)
Dave Goes Babysitting (24:33)
Morley's Birthday Bash (23:34)
Dave Gives a Speech (24:36)
Kenny Wong's Practical Jokes (26:49)
Dave's Wedding Ring (20:13)
Christmas with Rasheeda and Ahmeer (23:19)

A Story-Gram From Vinyl Cafe Inc. (2004)
Dad is Dying (25:06)
Gifted (22:48)
Tree of Heaven (21:28)
The Phone Message (23:46)
Labour Pains (18:27)
Morley's Book Club (19:58)
Bonus Video: "I Need to Pee" (9:10)

Vinyl Cafe: A Christmas Collection (2005)
Dave Cooks the Turkey
Ferrets for Christmas
Christmas on the Road
Christmas at the Turlingtons'
Polly Anderson's Christmas Party
Christmas Presents
On the Roof ("Dave on the Roof")

An Important Message From The Vinyl Cafe (2007)
The Hairdresser (20:16)
Sam the Athlete (21:29)
Tree Planting (17:53)
Dream Bunnies (19:10)
Teeth (24:29)
Sam Goes Green (24:01)
Carl's Retirement (21:29)

The Vinyl Cafe Storyland (2008)
Dave Goes to the Dentist (20:28)
Springhill ("The Laundry Chute") (20:49)
Sam Steals ("The Family Business") (21:56)
Dave's Shoelace ("Attack of the Treadmill") (15:25)
Remembrance Day (23:05)
Dave Buys a Coffin ("Dave's Funeral") (23:53)
Jim and Molly the Cat (23:29)

Vinyl Cafe Planet Boy (2009)
Planet Boy
The Science Experiment
A Trip to Quebec
The Waterslide
Sam's Predictions
Wally
Planet Stuart

Vinyl Cafe: Out and About (2010)
Petit Lac Noir (26:18)
The Cruise (25:00)
Rendi (21:34)
The Birthday Cake (21:15)
Opera (23:45)
The Canoe Trip (19:32)
Dave and the Bike (15:24)

Vinyl Cafe Family Pack (2011)
 Dave Goes to the Dentist (20:26)
 Odd Jobs (18:14)
 Dave and the Bike (15:18)
 Dave Cooks the Turkey (26:02)
 Holland (18:22)
 The Hairdresser (20:15)
 Labour Pains (18:25)
 Morley's Book Club (19:56)
 The Waterslide (22:35)
 Tree Planting (17:52)
 Sam the Athlete (20:19)
 Dream Bunnies (19:09)
 Cat in the Car (18:12)
 Arthur the Dog (14:33)
 Dave and the Duck (20:00)
 Toilet Training the Cat (20:41)

Vinyl Cafe Christmas Pack (2012)
 Christmas on the Road (24:18)
 Christmas in the Narrows (21:46)
 Dave's Christmas Parade (20:24)
 Dave Makes Snow (22:38)
 Morley's Christmas Concert (23:53)
 Dave Raises the Turkey (23:58)
 Rashida, Amir and the Great Gift-Giving (23:16)
 Polly Anderson's Christmas Party (22:44)
 Christmas at the Turlingtons' (22:30)
 Dave on the Roof (10:07)
 Ferrets for Christmas (24:47)
 Christmas Presents (20:32)
 Dave Cooks the Turkey (1996 original recording; bonus track) (21:38)

Vinyl Cafe: New Stories (2013)
 Sam's Underwear (18:28)
 Car Wash (15:35)
 Macaulay's Mountain (21:04)
 Code Yellow (22:46)
 The House Next Door (25:47)
 Curse of the Crayfish (22:52)
 Hello, Monster (25:45)
 The Yoga Retreat (16:33)
 Summer of Stars (20:34)
 London (23:05)
 Skunks (11:39)
 Annie's Turn (21:22)
 Sam's First Kiss (23:19)
 Grocery Cart (10:49)
 Le Morte D'Arthur (22:23)

Vinyl Cafe Auto Pack (2014)
 Defibrillator
 Rosemary Honey
 Spring in the Narrows
 Dave the Dog Walker
 Boy Wanted
 Dorothy’s Bookstore
 The Lottery Ticket
 The Black Beast of Margaree
 Kenny Wong’s Contest
 Rhoda’s Revenge
 Newsboy Dave
 Dave and the Roller Coaster
 Shirts
 Dog Pills
 Fish Head

The Vinyl Cafe Christmas Album (2014)
 Dave Cooks the Turkey (21:39)
 Christmas at the Turlingtons' (22:24)
Vinyl LP with MP3 download code.

Vinyl Cafe - Seasons (2015)
 Dave Makes Maple Syrup
 Steph's Statistics Exam
 The Man Who Punched Trees
 Mexican Climbing Mint
 Whatever Happened to Johnny Flowers?
 Dave and the Mouse
 Fireworks
 Steph Goes to University
 Halloween
 Jim's Toboggan
 Mary Turlington & Polly Anderson's Christmas Collision
 Christmas at Tommy's

Vinyl Cafe: Up and Away (2016)
 Kenny Wong and the Tank of Tranquility (18:21)
 Mary Turlington Has Lice (20:12)
 Dave and the Sourdough Starter (14:58)
 The Roundabout (19:33)
 The Greatest Hockey Game Ever Played (27:47)
 Sam Is Home Alone (23:29)
 Jimmy Walker of Foggy Bottom Bay (24:45)
 Arthur Takes the Cake (12:45)
 The Razor s Edge (20:54)
 A Letter from Camp (21:51)
 Dave and Tommy (19:27)
 Field Trip (23:01)
 Rock of Ages (11:31)
 The Turlingtons' Dog (17:14)
 Fire at the Old Town Hall (20:03)

Vinyl Cafe: The Unreleased Stories (2017)
 Dave and the Vacuum (18:53)
 The Summer Cottage (14:35)
 Morley's Garden (17:41)
 The Christmas Card (24:53)
 Murphy's Bar Mitzvah (19:04)
 World's Smallest Record Store (20:56)
 Stephanie and Tommy (21:27)
 Dave Crosses the Border (24:06)
 In the Weeds (22:36)
 Murphy Kruger, Philatelist (21:46)
 Have Snake, Will Travel (21:08)
 Dave's Inferno (22:00)
 The Lost Chords (20:15)

Vinyl Cafe 25 Years Vol.1 Dave and Morley Stories (2019)
 Dave and the Cell Phone
 Margaret Gets Married
 The One and Only Murphy Kruger
 Dave Versus the Flu
 A Case of the Dwindles
 Why I Buy 8-tracks
 The Great Train Adventure
 Dave’s Truck
 Stanley the Snoring Dog
 Walking Man
 The Mermaid and Other Mysteries
 Dave’s Christmas Tree
 Dave and Morley, Dancing

References

Dave and Morley
Dave and Morley
Dave and Morley
Dave and Morley stories